Stanislav Valeryevich Sukhina (born August 16, 1968 in Cherkasy, Ukraine, Soviet Union) is a Russian football official and a former referee and player. 

As a player, he played in the lower leagues for FC Avangard Kolomna (1989), FC Saturn Ramenskoye (1990) and FC Gigant Voskresensk (1994). He has been a FIFA international referee since 2003. He lives in Malakhovka and works as a university teacher. He has refereed games in 2010 World Cup qualifiers, the UEFA Champions League qualification rounds, and the UEFA Cup. He retired as a referee in 2012.

After retirement as a referee, he worked as the team director for FC Lokomotiv Moscow until June 2021. He was appointed team director of FC Fakel Voronezh in 2022.

References

1968 births
Sportspeople from Cherkasy
Living people
Russian football referees
Association football defenders
Russian footballers
FC Saturn Ramenskoye players